James King (born 27 December 1996) is an English former professional footballer who plays as a central defender.

Career
King began his career at Bradford City, signing a new one-year contract with the club in June 2016. He made his senior debut for the club on 9 November 2016, in an EFL Trophy game against Morecambe, playing out-of-position as a central midfielder. In March 2017 he joined Harrogate Town on loan, whilst still playing for Bradford City's reserves.

In May 2017 it was announced that he would be released by Bradford City at the end of the season, when his contract expired. He went on trial with Barrow, before signing with Liversedge in September 2017. He was still playing with Liversedge in December 2018.

Career statistics

References

1996 births
Living people
English footballers
Bradford City A.F.C. players
Harrogate Town A.F.C. players
Liversedge F.C. players
Association football defenders